Modern Greek (or , Kiní Neoellinikí Glóssa), generally referred to by speakers simply as Greek, refers collectively to the dialects of the Greek language spoken in the modern era, including the official standardized form of the languages sometimes referred to as Standard Modern Greek. The end of the Medieval Greek period and the beginning of Modern Greek is often symbolically assigned to the fall of the Byzantine Empire in 1453, even though that date marks no clear linguistic boundary and many characteristic features of the modern language arose centuries earlier, beginning around the fourth century AD.

During most of the Modern Greek period, the language existed in a situation of diglossia, with regional spoken dialects existing side by side with learned, more archaic written forms, as with the vernacular and learned varieties (Dimotiki and Katharevousa) that co-existed in Greece throughout much of the 19th and 20th centuries.

Varieties

Varieties of Modern Greek include Demotic, Katharevousa, Pontic, Cappadocian, Mariupolitan, Southern Italian, Yevanic, and Tsakonian.

Demotic 

Strictly speaking, Demotic or Dimotiki, refers to all popular varieties of Modern Greek that followed a common evolutionary path from Koine and have retained a high degree of mutual intelligibility to the present. As shown in Ptochoprodromic and Acritic poems, Demotic Greek was the vernacular already before the 11th century and called the "Roman" language of the Byzantine Greeks, notably in peninsular Greece, the Greek islands, coastal Asia Minor, Constantinople, and Cyprus.

Today, a standardized variety of Demotic Greek is the official language of Greece and Cyprus, and is referred to as "Standard Modern Greek", or less strictly simply as "Greek", "Modern Greek", or "Demotic".

Demotic Greek comprises various regional varieties with minor linguistic differences, mainly in phonology and vocabulary. Due to the high degree of mutual intelligibility of these varieties, Greek linguists refer to them as "idioms" of a wider "Demotic dialect", known as "Koine Modern Greek" ( - 'common Neo-Hellenic'). Most English-speaking linguists however refer to them as "dialects", emphasizing degrees of variation only when necessary. Demotic Greek varieties are divided into two main groups, Northern and Southern.

The dropped vowels' existence is implicit, and may affect surrounding phonemes: for example, a dropped  palatalizes preceding consonants, just like an  that is pronounced. Southern variants do not exhibit these phonological shifts.

Examples of Northern dialects are Rumelian (Constantinople), Epirote, Macedonian, Thessalian, Thracian, Northern Euboean, Sporades, Samos, Smyrna, and Sarakatsanika.
The Southern category is divided into groups that include:
Old Athenian-Maniot: Megara, Aegina, Athens, Cyme (Old Athenian) and Mani Peninsula (Maniot)
Ionian-Peloponnesian: Peloponnese (except Mani), Ionian Islands, Attica, Boeotia, and Southern Euboea
Cretan-Cycladian: Cyclades, Crete, and several enclaves in Syria and Lebanon
Southeastern: Chios, Ikaria, Dodecanese, and Cyprus.

Demotic Greek has officially been taught in monotonic Greek script since 1982.

Katharevousa 

Katharevousa is a semi-artificial sociolect promoted in the 19th century at the foundation of the modern Greek state, as a compromise between Classical Greek and modern Demotic. It was the official language of modern Greece until 1976.

Katharevousa is written in polytonic Greek script. Also, while Demotic Greek contains loanwords from Turkish, Italian, Latin, and other languages, these have for the most part been purged from Katharevousa. See also the Greek language question.

Pontic 

Pontic was originally spoken along the mountainous Black Sea coast of Turkey, the so-called Pontus region, until most of its speakers were killed or displaced to modern Greece during the Pontic genocide (1919–1921), followed later by the population exchange between Greece and Turkey in 1923. (Small numbers of Muslim speakers of Pontic Greek escaped these events and still reside in the Pontic villages of Turkey.) It derives from Hellenistic and Medieval Koine and preserves characteristics of Ionic due to ancient colonizations of the region. Pontic evolved as a separate dialect from Demotic Greek as a result of the region's isolation from the Greek mainstream after the Fourth Crusade fragmented the Byzantine Empire into separate kingdoms (see Empire of Trebizond).

Cappadocian 

Cappadocian is a Greek dialect of central Turkey of the same fate as Pontic; its speakers settled in mainland Greece after the Greek genocide (1919–1921) and the later Population exchange between Greece and Turkey in 1923. Cappadocian Greek diverged from the other Byzantine Greek dialects earlier, beginning with the Turkish conquests of central Asia Minor in the 11th and 12th centuries, and so developed several radical features, such as the loss of the gender for nouns. Having been isolated from the crusader conquests (Fourth Crusade) and the later Venetian influence of the Greek coast, it retained the Ancient Greek terms for many words that were replaced with Romance ones in Demotic Greek.  The poet Rumi, whose name means "Roman", referring to his residence amongst the "Roman" Greek speakers of Cappadocia, wrote a few poems in Cappadocian Greek, one of the earliest attestations of the dialect.

Mariupolitan 

Ruméika or Mariupolitan Greek is a dialect spoken in about 17 villages around the northern coast of the Sea of Azov in southern Ukraine and Russia.  Mariupolitan Greek is closely related to Pontic Greek and evolved from the dialect of Greek spoken in Crimea, which was a part of the Byzantine Empire and then the Pontic Empire of Trebizond, until that latter state fell to the Ottomans in 1461. Thereafter, the Crimean Greek state continued to exist as the independent Greek Principality of Theodoro. The Greek-speaking inhabitants of Crimea were invited by Catherine the Great to resettle in the new city of Mariupol after the Russo-Turkish War (1768–74) to escape the then Muslim-dominated Crimea. Mariupolitan's main features have certain similarities with both Pontic (e.g. the lack of synizesis of -ía, éa) and the northern varieties of the core dialects (e.g. the northern vocalism).

Southern Italian 

Southern Italian or Italiot comprises both Calabrian and Griko varieties, spoken by around 15 villages in the regions of Calabria and Apulia. The Southern Italian dialect is the last living trace of Hellenic elements in Southern Italy that once formed Magna Graecia. Its origins can be traced to the Dorian Greek settlers who colonised the area from Sparta and Corinth in 700 BC.

It has received significant Koine Greek influence through Byzantine Greek colonisers who re-introduced Greek language to the region, starting with Justinian's conquest of Italy in late antiquity and continuing through the Middle Ages. Griko and Demotic are mutually intelligible to some extent, but the former shares some common characteristics with Tsakonian.

Yevanic 

Yevanic is an almost extinct language of Romaniote Jews. The language was already in decline for centuries until most of its speakers were killed in the Holocaust. Afterward, the language was mostly kept by remaining Romaniote emigrants to Israel, where it was displaced by modern Hebrew.

Tsakonian 

Tsakonian is spoken in its full form today only in a small number of villages around the town of Leonidio in the region of Arcadia in the Southern Peloponnese, and partially spoken further afield in the area. Tsakonian evolved directly from Laconian (ancient Spartan) and therefore descends from Doric Greek.

It has limited input from Hellenistic Koine and is significantly different from and not mutually intelligible with other Greek varieties (such as Demotic Greek and Pontic Greek). Some linguists consider it a separate language because of this.

Phonology and orthography

A series of radical sound changes starting in Koine Greek has led to a phonological system in Modern Greek that is significantly different from that of Ancient Greek. Instead of the complex vowel system of Ancient Greek, with its four vowel-height levels, length distinction, and multiple diphthongs, Modern Greek has a simple system of five vowels. This came about through a series of mergers, especially towards  (iotacism).

Modern Greek consonants are plain (voiceless unaspirated) stops, voiced stops, or voiced and unvoiced fricatives. Modern Greek has not preserved length in vowels or consonants.

Modern Greek is written in the Greek alphabet, which has 24 letters, each with a capital and lowercase (small) form. The letter sigma additionally has a special final form. There are two diacritical symbols, the acute accent which indicates stress and the diaeresis marking a vowel letter as not being part of a digraph. Greek has a mixed historical and phonemic orthography, where historical spellings are used if their pronunciation matches modern usage. The correspondence between consonant phonemes and graphemes is largely unique, but several of the vowels can be spelt in multiple ways.  Thus reading is easy but spelling is difficult.

A number of diacritical signs were used until 1982, when they were officially dropped from Greek spelling as no longer corresponding to the modern pronunciation of the language. Monotonic orthography is today used in official usage, in schools and for most purposes of everyday writing in Greece. Polytonic orthography, besides being used for older varieties of Greek, is still used in book printing, especially for academic and belletristic purposes, and in everyday use by some conservative writers and elderly people. The Greek Orthodox Church continues to use polytonic and the late Christodoulos of Athens and the Holy Synod of the Church of Greece have requested the reintroduction of polytonic as the official script.

All those letters represent fricatives in Modern Greek, but they were used for occlusives with the same (or with a similar) articulation point in Ancient Greek.

When these digraphs are preceded by a vowel, they are pronounced  and  before front vowels ( and ) and  before the back ( and ). The digraph  may be pronounced  in some words ( before front vowels and  before back ones).

Syntax and morphology

Modern Greek is largely a synthetic language. Modern Greek and Albanian are the only two modern Indo-European languages that retain a synthetic passive (the North Germanic passive is a recent innovation based on a grammaticalized reflexive pronoun).

Differences from Classical Greek 
Modern Greek has changed from Classical Greek in morphology and syntax, losing some features and gaining others.

Features lost:

 dative case
 optative mood
 infinitive
 dual number
 participles (except the perfect middle-passive participle)
 third person imperative
 reduplicative perfect

Features gained:

 gerund
 modal particle  (a contraction of  →  →  → ), which marks future tense and conditional mood
 auxiliary verb forms for certain verb forms (in particular the perfect tense)
 aspectual distinction in future tense between imperfective (present) and perfective (aorist)

Modern Greek has developed a simpler system of grammatical prefixes marking tense and aspect of a verb, such as augmentation and reduplication, and has lost some patterns of noun declension and some distinct forms in the declensions.

Most of these features are shared with other languages spoken in the Balkan peninsula (see Balkan sprachbund), although Greek does not show all typical Balkan areal features, such as the postposed article.

Because of the influence of Katharevousa, however, Demotic is not commonly used in its purest form. Archaisms are still widely used, especially in writing and in more formal speech, as well as in some everyday expressions, such as the dative  ('okay', literally 'in order') or the third person imperative ! ('long live!').

Sample text
The following is a sample text in Modern Greek of Article 1 of the Universal Declaration of Human Rights (by the United Nations):

References

Further reading

External links

 Portal for the Greek Language (modern & ancient) of the Center for the Greek Language
 Hellenic National Corpus of the Institute for Language & Speech Processing
 Audio example of Modern Greek

Courses
 Online course "Filoglossia" by ILSP
 Greek online course "Greek by Radio" from Cyprus radio broadcasting CyBC in English, 105 lessons with Real audio files

Dictionaries and glossaries
 Greek–English Dictionary Georgacas for Modern Greek Literature
 Triantafyllides Dictionary for Standard Modern Greek (Lexicon of the Modern Greek Koine)
 Modern Greek - English glossary
 English–Greek Dictionary (Modern Greek) 

Grammar
 Illustrated Modern Greek grammar 

Institutes
 Official website of the Center for the Greek Language 
 Institute of Modern Greek Studies of the Manolis Triandaphyllidis Foundation at the Aristotle University of Thessaloniki
 Center for the Research of the Modern Greek Dialects and Idioms of the Academy of Athens (modern)
 The Cyprus Linguistics Society (CyLing)
 Institute for Language & Speech Processing

Languages attested from the 15th century